Rex Everett Chapman (born October 5, 1967) is an American former professional basketball player and social media influencer. Chapman was a high school phenom in Kentucky, winning numerous awards for his play. In two seasons at the University of Kentucky, he won further awards and scored more than 1,000 points. Chapman was the first draft pick of the expansion Charlotte Hornets and played on four National Basketball Association (NBA) teams. Over his 12-year career, he averaged 14.6 points per game and appeared in two slam dunk competitions.

Injuries sustained on NBA courts led Chapman to an addiction to opioids. Following an arrest for shoplifting, he entered drug rehab for the third time and was able to overcome his addiction. After retiring, Chapman held several jobs with NBA teams culminating in being the vice president of player personnel with the Denver Nuggets. He is a broadcaster for University of Kentucky basketball games.

Early life and education
Rex Chapman was born October 5, 1967, in Bowling Green, Kentucky. Rex's father is Wayne Chapman, who played in the American Basketball Association and coached Kentucky Wesleyan College to two NCAA Division II national championships. Chapman had a turbulent relationship with his father; he and his sister, Jenny, "used to pray that Wayne's teams would win" so the mood of the house would not be tense, while his mother, Laura, would attempt to defuse the tension.

Amateur career
Chapman was a high school basketball star at Apollo High School in Owensboro, Kentucky. During his junior year, Chapman led his team to the state quarterfinals. He racked up numerous awards and accolades his senior year including Mr. Basketball of Kentucky,  Gatorade State Player of the Year, Associated Press Player of the Year, and McDonalds's All-American. In 2020 radio host Matt Jones described Chapman as, "the biggest high school basketball player that ever came from the state." He was inducted into the Kentucky High School Basketball Hall of Fame in 2012. Chapman was heavily recruited by many universities, but he chose to stay close to home when he signed with the University of Kentucky.

Chapman was a star with the Kentucky Wildcats. His freshman year, he averaged 16 points a game, was named Southeastern Conference (SEC) Freshman of the Year, set a record for points by a freshman, and led the Wildcats to the 1987 NCAA tournament. He improved his sophomore year average to 19 points a game. Chapman, joined by teammates such as future NBA journeyman Winston Bennett, helped lead Kentucky to the SEC title with a 27–6 record. The Wildcats were ranked as the 6th college basketball team in the nation by the Associated Press and United Press International and secured the No. 2 seed in the South region of the 1988 NCAA tournament. Kentucky reached the Sweet Sixteen, where Chapman scored a career best 30 points in a losing effort against Villanova. Chapman was named to the All-SEC Team both of his college years and amassed a total of 1,073 points before opting to enter the NBA draft. Chapman left the University as a "campus legend" with the nickname "King Rex".

Chapman found the off-court scrutiny and attention difficult. He said he was harassed by other students and the coaching staff for continuing to date his black high school girlfriend. "It wore on me," said Chapman, who is white. "It was hateful."

Professional career

Charlotte Hornets
The Charlotte Hornets of the National Basketball Association (NBA), an expansion team, selected Chapman with the 8th overall pick in the 1988 NBA draft; he became the first player ever drafted by the Hornets.  Chapman averaged 16.9 points per game in his rookie season. Chapman competed in the 1990 and 1991 Slam Dunk Contests, earning recognition for his dunks where he would flip the ball. After two-and-a-half seasons with the Hornets, Chapman was traded midway through the 1991–1992 season to the Washington Bullets. He was injured, however, and could only participate in the final game of the season.

Washington Bullets and Miami Heat
On February 19, 1992, the Hornets traded Chapman to the Washington Bullets in exchange for Tom Hammonds. He played 60 games during the 1993–94 season and 45 games during the 1994–95 season. After getting off to a strong start in the 94–95 season and being named an All Star for the only time in his career, Chapman injured his ankle and did not play in the game. Danny Ainge, who later coached Chapman with the Phoenix Suns and became a close friend, speculated that Chapman played smart all-out basketball in an attempt to win a championship or be an All Star.

The Bullets traded Chapman with Terrence Rencher to the Miami Heat for Ed Stokes and Jeff Webster in June 1995. Chapman averaged 14.8 points per game during the 1995–96 season. On February 23, 1996, he scored 39 points (converting 9-of-10 three-point attempts) and led an injury-plagued Miami Heat team with an 8-man roster to a 113–104 victory over the Chicago Bulls, handing the Bulls one of their 10 losses during their historic 72–10 run. Unfortunately, later in the season Chapman found himself on the injured list again and only participated in 56 games. He eventually signed with the Suns.

Phoenix Suns
Chapman played in 65 games, and scored 13 points per game for Phoenix for the 1996–1997 season. He played well in the Suns' last four games of the regular season. He had two memorable games against the Seattle SuperSonics in the first round of the play-offs. In Game 1, he set a play-off record for three-point shots (9), which was surpassed by Klay Thompson (11) in 2016 and Damian Lillard (12, 2OT) in 2021. In game four, he hit an off-balance three-point shot on an inbounds pass to send the game to overtime, although the Suns went on to lose.

Chapman played 68 games during the 1997–1998 season for the Suns, scoring almost 16 points per game. However, he was injured again during the strike-shortened 1999 season, playing 38 games. During his time with the Suns, Chapman began having severe nerve pains in his foot, had seven surgeries, and began to regularly take Vicodin. After 53 games during the 1999–2000 season, Chapman's various injuries and declining performance led him to retire. In the spring before he retired, Chapman had an emergency appendectomy. After the surgery he was prescribed OxyContin which increased his drug dependency, in part because it also helped ease the social anxiety he felt.

Chapman played a total of 666 regular season NBA games, scoring 9,731 points for an average of 14.6 points per game, with 1,798 assists for an average of 2.7 assists per game, and 1,645 rebounds, for 2.5 rebounds per game.

Post-playing life
After retiring from active play Chapman's drug addiction intensified. He also began betting on horse racing daily. Betting on horses had been a distraction for him from childhood through his time in the NBA, where he hid his habit. Chapman eventually stopped betting and went to Gamblers Anonymous meetings. Urged by Ainge to enter rehab for his drug problem, Chapman was diagnosed with attention deficit disorder and depression, for which he was medicated. Following rehab, he was troubled by abdomen pain and had surgery to remove a pin from his wrist. Following the surgery he was prescribed Vicodin and resumed his addiction, seeking treatment in 2002. After breaking the addiction, a doctor suggested he try Suboxone, medicine used to treat opioid addiction, which successfully addressed a resurgence of his abdomen pains. Over time, Suboxone caused Chapman to lose energy and clouded his thinking.

Chapman held several jobs in short succession following his retirement. After his second time in rehab, he was hired by the Suns, first as a scout and later as Director of Basketball Operations.  He served as a color commentator on TNT during the NBA Playoffs. In 2005, he moved from Phoenix to accept a personnel scout position with the Minnesota Timberwolves. In 2006, he accepted the position of vice president of player personnel with the Denver Nuggets which he held for four years.

When he left the Nuggets his personal life was in trouble. He was divorcing his wife, sharing custody of their four children.  Chapman had also become estranged from his parents and sister. His life continued to spiral down after leaving basketball.  He worked in a variety of jobs as a basketball broadcaster including for Grand Canyon University in 2013.

In September 2014, Chapman was arrested for shoplifting merchandise from an Apple Store in Scottsdale, Arizona. Chapman made it appear that he was paying for an item at self checkout, but left the store and pawned the item to pay for gambling debts. Returning to the store several times, he was eventually identified by multiple employees based on his tenure in the NBA. Following the arrest Chapman entered a rehab facility in Louisville, Kentucky, run by a former University of Kentucky teammate. After a week of being drug free his abdomen pain returned and he was taken to a hospital where he was treated for an ulcer. Chapman's pain went away but the experience angered him, "This whole time I've been thinking I've got this jones for pain medication, it was really just an ulcer". During this time in rehab, he was prescribed Zoloft for his depression and began deep psychotherapy for the first time.

Following his time in Louisville, he continued to seek treatment in Texas and was hired by TNT to broadcast Kentucky's 2015 Final Four Game. In September 2015, Chapman pleaded guilty to four felony charges and was sentenced to probation. He agreed to pay more than $15,000 to the Apple Store and complete 750 hours of community service. He eventually moved back to Lexington where he states he stays clean, eats healthily, and swims daily. He hosts a pre-game show before Wildcat basketball games.

Social media influencer
Chapman has been labeled as a social media influencer for his activity on Twitter, with over a million followers.  Chapman, however, does not agree with being labeled that way and commented in 2020, "I'm not even sure what that means... Me, an influencer? Man, I hope not."  He first joined Twitter as part of his job as a broadcaster. He began attracting followers after posting a video of dolphins charging into a paddle boarder, the first in a series of "block or charge?" tweets.

After previously declining any kind of sponsorship, during the COVID-19 pandemic Chapman was able to raise more than $150,000 to support those experiencing financial hardship. Despite his social media success, Chapman said he is glad that it was not around when he was a professional athlete. Since 2019, Chapman has been the television presenter of a Block or Charge show which appeared on Adult Swim, based on his tweets. He also hosts a podcast called The Rex Chapman Show, which debuted on Basketballnews.com on March 16, 2021, with friend and actor Josh Hopkins.

Television 
In January 2022, CNN announced that Chapman will appear as a host on CNN+, the network's streaming platform. The show, simply titled Rex Chapman, premiered on April 4, 2022 and aired four episodes before the service shut down on April 28.

In March 2022, Chapman served as a studio analyst for coverage of the NCAA men's basketball tournament.

In September 2022, entertainment business magazine Variety announced Chapman's podcast, “Charges with Rex Chapman”, would be turning into a TV show. Like the podcast, the new series will come from Portal A and Steve Nash's CTRL Media.

Notes

References

External links
 
 Our National Pain a 2017 essay by Chapman for Sports Illustrated

1967 births
Living people
All-American college men's basketball players
American men's basketball players
Basketball players at the 1987 Pan American Games
Basketball players from Kentucky
Charlotte Hornets draft picks
Charlotte Hornets players
College basketball announcers in the United States
Kentucky Wildcats men's basketball players
McDonald's High School All-Americans
Medalists at the 1987 Pan American Games
Miami Heat players
National Basketball Association broadcasters
Pan American Games medalists in basketball
Pan American Games silver medalists for the United States
Parade High School All-Americans (boys' basketball)
Phoenix Suns players
Shooting guards
Sportspeople from Bowling Green, Kentucky
Sportspeople from Owensboro, Kentucky
Washington Bullets players